Walt Disney Records: The Legacy Collection is a compilation album series produced and released by Walt Disney Records.

Background
The majority of the series commemorates distinct anniversaries of Disney films and the 60th anniversary of Disneyland, containing newly remastered versions of the original and expanded soundtrack albums. Each individual title features original artwork and illustrations by Walt Disney Animation Studios visual development artist, Lorelay Bové. A majority of the releases feature "The Lost Chords"; newly recorded tracks done in-house by Disney staff musicians of originally discarded songs and produced to sound period-appropriate to their album counterparts. The first entry in the series, dedicated to The Lion King, was released on June 24, 2014. The sixteenth volume in the series, dedicated to Aladdin was released on September 9, 2022. A box set containing the first twelve volumes was released on November 15, 2015.

The Lion King

The Legacy Collection: The Lion King was released on June 24, 2014, in conjunction with the 20th anniversary of The Lion King. The two-disc album includes the film's original soundtrack and approximately thirty minutes of previously unreleased music mixed by Alan Meyerson, as well as liner notes from Hans Zimmer and producer Don Hahn.

Footnotes

Mary Poppins

The Legacy Collection: Mary Poppins was released as a three-disc album on August 26, 2014, to coincide with the 50th anniversary of Mary Poppins. The first disc contains the film's complete original soundtrack, whereas the second disc contains fifteen demo recordings by the Sherman Brothers and seven "Lost Chords" recordings. The third disc consists entirely of archival recordings of story meetings held at the Walt Disney Studios between P.L. Travers, Richard M. Sherman, Robert B. Sherman, and Don DaGradi, as well as press interviews with Julie Andrews, Dick Van Dyke, Irwin Kostal, and the Shermans.

Sleeping Beauty

The Legacy Collection: Sleeping Beauty was released as a two-disc album on October 7, 2014, to coincide with the 55th anniversary of Sleeping Beauty. The first disc contains the film's complete original soundtrack and the second disc contains three demo recordings, three "Lost Chords" recordings, and four bonus tracks.

The Little Mermaid

The Legacy Collection: The Little Mermaid was released as a two-disc album on November 24, 2014, to coincide with the 25th anniversary of The Little Mermaid. The album features the film's complete original soundtrack, as well as work tapes and demo recording sessions performed by composer Alan Menken and lyricist Howard Ashman.

Fantasia

The Legacy Collection: Fantasia was released as a four-disc album on January 13, 2015, to coincide with the 75th anniversary of Fantasia. The album features the original recordings conducted by Leopold Stokowski and performed by the Philadelphia Orchestra, as well as the 1982 digital re-recordings conducted by Irwin Kostal, two bonus tracks narrated by Sterling Holloway, and the previously unreleased recording of Clair de Lune, a segment that was cut from the final running order.

Pinocchio

The Legacy Collection: Pinocchio was released as a two-disc album on February 10, 2015, to coincide with the 75th anniversary of Pinocchio. The album includes the film's complete soundtrack, three "Lost Chords" recordings, and five bonus tracks from The Mickey Mouse Club.

All songs are composed by Leigh Harline, with lyrics by Ned Washington. All scores are composed by Harline and Paul Smith

Tracks 4-8 are written by Jimmie Dodd.

Lady and the Tramp

The Legacy Collection: Lady and the Tramp was released on April 28, 2015, as a two-disc album to coincide with the 60th anniversary of Lady and the Tramp. The album includes the film's complete original soundtrack, one demo recording, two "Lost Chords" recordings, and six bonus tracks. The album was released in traditional retail forms on August 21, 2015.

All songs are written by Peggy Lee and Sonny Burke. All scores are composed by Oliver Wallace.

Disneyland

The Legacy Collection: Disneyland was released exclusively at the Disneyland Resort on May 20, 2015, to coincide with the 60th anniversary of Disneyland. The three-disc album consists entirely of music, songs and audio, featured across a variety of attractions at both Disneyland and Disney California Adventure. The album was released in traditional retail forms on August 21, 2015.

Cinderella

The Legacy Collection: Cinderella was released as a two-disc album on June 16, 2015, to coincide with the 65th anniversary of Cinderella. The album includes the film's original soundtrack, seven demo recordings, seven "Lost Chords" recordings, and nine bonus tracks.

Toy Story

The Legacy Collection: Toy Story was released as a two-disc album on July 10, 2015, to coincide with the 20th anniversary of Toy Story. The album features the film's complete original soundtrack, four demo recordings, and three instrumental versions of the film's three songs, as well as thanks from composer Randy Newman and director John Lasseter to the orchestra.

All songs and score written, performed and composed by Randy Newman, unless otherwise noted.

Pocahontas

The Legacy Collection: Pocahontas was released on August 7, 2015, as a two-disc album to coincide with the 20th anniversary of Pocahontas. The release includes the film's complete original soundtrack and five demo recordings.

The Aristocats

The Legacy Collection: The Aristocats was released on August 21, 2015, as a two-disc album to coincide with the 45th anniversary of The Aristocats. The album features the film's complete original soundtrack—released for the first time in its entirety—as well as, four demo recordings, four "Lost Chords" recordings, and five bonus tracks.

Robin Hood

The Legacy Collection: Robin Hood was released on August 4, 2017, as a two-disc soundtrack album. The album features the complete original soundtrack from Robin Hood, released for the first time in its entirety. The album also includes five unreleased demos and the full 1974 album, Let's Hear It for Robin Hood.

Beauty and the Beast

The Legacy Collection: Beauty and the Beast was released on February 9, 2018, as a two-disc soundtrack album. The album features the 1991 original soundtrack from Beauty and the Beast, including deleted songs, extended score, and early demos.

The Hunchback of Notre Dame 

The Legacy Collection: The Hunchback of Notre Dame was released as a two-disc soundtrack album on September 22, 2021, to coincide with the 25th anniversary of The Hunchback of Notre Dame.

Aladdin 

The Legacy Collection: Aladdin was released on September 9, 2022, to coincide with the film's 30th anniversary. The album features the original 1992 soundtrack from Aladdin, including a deleted song, extended score, and alternate score.

References

External links
 Official website

2014 compilation albums
2015 compilation albums
Compilation album series
Disneyland
Reissue albums
Walt Disney Records compilation albums
Disney animation soundtracks
Disney theme park albums
2017 compilation albums
2018 compilation albums
2021 compilation albums
2022 compilation albums